Bullet is a Swedish heavy metal band, formed in Växjö in 2001 by Hampus Klang and Dag "Hell" Hofer. The band released their first demo Heavy Metal Highway 2002 and released their album Heading for the Top in 2006 on Black Lodge record label. Iron Maiden singer Bruce Dickinson played the Bullet song "Turn it Up Loud" from their album Heading for the Top on his radio program on BBC 2006.

In 2008, Bullet released their second album, Bite the Bullet. In June 2009, Bullet played with AC/DC at Ullevi in Gothenburg, and in October 2009, Bullet played two songs in the Globe (around 15,000 people) before the NHL match between Detroit Red Wings and St. Louis. Their third album, Highway Pirates, was released in early 2011.

Guitarist Hampus Klang has also played in the grind metal band Birdflesh. and bassist Adam Hector sang in the hardcore band Path of No Return.

The band has played with acts Ambush and Dead Lord, who are also from Växjö.

Discography

Albums
 Heading for the Top (2006)
 Bite the Bullet (2008)
 Highway Pirates (2011)
 Full Pull (2012)
 Storm of Blades (2014)
 Dust to Gold (2018)

Live albums
Live (2019)

7" singles & EPs
 "Speeding in the Night" EP (2003)
 "Full Pull" (2012)
 "Storm of Blades" (2014)
 "High Roller" (Enforcer) / "Back on the Road" (Bullet)

Band members

Timeline

References

External links

Swedish heavy metal musical groups
Musical groups established in 2001